Van Mierlo is a Dutch toponymic surname, meaning "from Mierlo".  People with this surname include:

Godfried van Mierlo (1518–1587), Dutch Dominican Bishop of Haarlem and Abbot of Egmond 
Hans van Mierlo (1931–2010), Dutch politician, Minister of Foreign Affairs and Deputy Prime Minister
Toine van Mierlo (1957), Dutch footballer

Dutch-language surnames
Surnames of Dutch origin